Donald Jacobs (22 June 192730 October 2017) was a dean emeritus of Kellogg School of Management, Northwestern University. He was a dean of the school for 26 years, from 1975 to 2001.

Early life 
Jacobs was born in the west side of Chicago, and attended Austin High School.

Education
Jacobs graduated with a  BA in economics from Roosevelt University in 1949. Subsequently he obtained an MA in economics from Columbia University (1951) and a Ph.D. in economics from Columbia University in 1956.

Career

Kellogg School of Management
At Kellogg School of Management, Jacobs was a faculty member from 1957 to 2017 and taught finance, including international finance and corporate governance. He served as a dean at the Kellogg school for 26 years from 1975 to 2001, during which time he led the school to become one of the top business schools in the world. He had been a Dean Emeritus of the school since 2001.

Personal life 
Jacobs died at Evanston Hospital on October 30th, 2017, at the age of 90.

References

1927 births
2017 deaths
Roosevelt University alumni
Columbia Graduate School of Arts and Sciences alumni
American economists
Northwestern University faculty
Kellogg School of Management faculty
People from Chicago